is a former Japanese football player.

Playing career
Sakurai was born in Shizuoka Prefecture on May 4, 1977. After graduating from Shizuoka Gakuen High School, he joined J1 League club Yokohama Flügels in 1996. He also played Argentine club Gimnasia y Esgrima La Plata from 1996 to 1997. However he could hardly play in the match until 1998. Yokohama Flügels was disbanded end of 1998 season due to financial strain, he moved to J2 League club Consadole Sapporo in 1999. He played several matches in 2 seasons and he retired end of 2000 season.

Club statistics

References

External links

1977 births
Living people
Association football people from Shizuoka Prefecture
Japanese footballers
J1 League players
J2 League players
Yokohama Flügels players
Hokkaido Consadole Sapporo players
Association football forwards